is a Japanese light novel series written by Saekisan and illustrated by Hanekoto. Originally published online on Shōsetsuka ni Narō, SB Creative has released seven volumes of the series under their GA Bunko label since June 2019. Yen Press holds the license to publish the series in North America in English. A manga adaptation with art by Wan Shibata and composition by Suzu Yūki has been serialized via Square Enix's online manga magazine Manga UP! since January 2022. As of December 2022, its chapters have been collected in two tankōbon volumes. An anime television series adaptation by Project No.9 premiered in January 2023.

Plot
Amane lives alone in an apartment, and the most beautiful girl in school, Mahiru, lives just next door. They've almost never spoken despite being in the same class — until the day he sees her in distress on a rainy day and lends her his umbrella. To return the favor, she offers him help around the house, and a relationship slowly begins to blossom as the distance between them closes.

Characters

The protagonist of the series, he lives alone in a small apartment. Because he is not good at organizing things, he often eats out or buys food from convenience stores.

The main female protagonist, she lives alone in a small apartment next door to Amane. She is idolized at school because of her beauty as well as her academic and athletic abilities, and is given the nickname of Angel. She comes from a rich family, but she lives away from her parents as they are not on good terms with each other.
Her name, Mahiru (lit. "noon"), which was named by her father, Asahi (lit. "morning sun"), represents the noon in between morning and night, which is the name of her mother, Sayo (lit. "little night").

Amane's friend and classmate.

Amane's classmate and Itsuki's girlfriend.

Media

Light novel
The light novel series originally began serialization online on the website Shōsetsuka ni Narō in December 2018. SB Creative then acquired the series and has published seven volumes under their GA Bunko label since June 2019, while Yen Press holds the license for English release in North America. The English translation is done by Nicole Wilder.

The illustrator was changed from Hazano Kazutake to Hanekoto in Volume 2.

Manga
A manga adaptation, which was announced on November 18, 2019, with art by Wan Shibata and composition by Suzu Yūki began serialization in Square Enix's online manga magazine Manga UP! on January 6, 2022. As of December 7, 2022, its chapters have been collected in two tankōbon volumes.

Anime
An anime television series adaptation was announced on January 4, 2022. It is produced by Project No.9 and directed by Lihua Wang, with supervision by Kenichi Imaizumi, scripts written by Keiichirō Ōchi, character designs by Takayuki Noguchi, and music composed by Moe Hyūga. The series premiered on January 7, 2023, on Tokyo MX and other networks. The opening theme song is  performed by Masayoshi Ōishi, while the ending theme song is a cover of Mongol800's  performed by Manaka Iwami. Crunchyroll licensed the series.

Reception
The light novel ranked tenth in Takarajimasha's annual light novel guide book Kono Light Novel ga Sugoi! in the bunkobon category, and sixth overall among the other new series in 2020. The series has sold one hundred thousand copies as of April 2020.

According to Oricon, in the first week of release the fifth volume sold 19,791 copies in Japan, which placed it first on the Oricon Weekly Light Novel chart.

See also
 Saint Cecilia and Pastor Lawrence, manga series illustrated by Hazano Kazutake

Notes

References

External links
  at Shōsetsuka ni Narō 
  
  
 

2019 Japanese novels
2023 anime television series debuts
Anime and manga based on light novels
Crunchyroll anime
GA Bunko
Gangan Comics manga
Japanese webcomics
Light novels
Light novels first published online
Project No.9
Romantic comedy anime and manga
Shōnen manga
Shōsetsuka ni Narō
Slice of life anime and manga
Toho Animation
Tokyo MX original programming
Yen Press titles